Eduardus is a masculine given name which may refer to:

 Duarte Lobo (c. 1565–1646), Latinized as Eduardus Lupus, Portuguese composer
 Eduardus Halim (born 1961), Indonesian-American pianist
 Eduardus Johannes Petrus van Meeuwen (1802–1873), Dutch politician
 Ed Nijpels (born 1950), Dutch retired politician
 Eduardus Sangsun (1943–2008), Indonesian Roman Catholic bishop
 Eduardus van Voorst tot Voorst (1874–1945), Dutch sport shooter

Masculine given names